A 32-pounder is a gun firing a shot of 32 pounds weight, a mass of .

Examples include:

Naval artillery in the Age of Sail
32-pounder gun – a smooth-bore muzzle-loading gun firing bullets of 32 pounds, c. 1500 – c. 1880
A size of Dahlgren gun of the mid-19th century
SBBL 32-pounder a breech-loading gun converted from older 42 cwt muzzle-loading 32-pounders, late 19th century
Ordnance QF 32-pounder of the Second World War